The Drive DMACK Fiesta Trophy (also known as the Drive DMACK Cup in 2014) was a complementary series to the FIA World Rally Championship (WRC) held since 2014 till 2016 WRC seasons. Drivers used the same cars produced by M-Sport - Ford Fiesta R2 and the same tyres provided by DMACK. The winner was entered in WRC-2 for DMACK World Rally Team the following season. It was created when Citroën won bid for official JWRC cars and M-Sport wanted to find use for trophy Fiestas.

Champions

Statistics

See also
Pirelli Star Driver

External links
Homepage

 
World Rally Championship
Rally racing series
One-make series